Hall Island may refer to:

Hall Island (Alaska), an unpopulated island in Alaska
Hall Island (Arctic), an island in the Franz Josef Land archipelago
Hall Island (Michigan), an island in the state of Michigan
Hall Island, Willis Islands, a small island in the South Georgian Islands
Hall Island (Washington), one of the San Juan Islands
Little Hall Island, Nunavut, Canada
The Hall Islands, two large atolls in Micronesia